James Hutton Mackenzie (27 September 1849–10 July 1949) was a New Zealand presbyterian minister. He was born in Thornhill, Dumfriesshire, Scotland on 27 September 1849.

References

1849 births
1949 deaths
New Zealand Presbyterians
People from Thornhill, Dumfries and Galloway
Scottish emigrants to New Zealand